Laura Devlin (born April 13, 1960) is an American politician who served in the Connecticut House of Representatives from the 134th district from 2015 to 2023. She was chosen to be the running mate of Bob Stefanowski in the 2022 election for governor.

References

1960 births
21st-century American politicians
21st-century American women politicians
Living people
Republican Party members of the Connecticut House of Representatives
Women state legislators in Connecticut